The Nicaraguan Lutheran Church of Faith and Hope (Iglesia Luterana de Nicaragua Fe y Esperanza) is a Lutheran denomination in Nicaragua. It is a member of the Lutheran World Federation, which it joined in 1994.

External links 
  
Lutheran World Federation listing

Lutheran denominations
Lutheranism in South America
Lutheran World Federation members